Berberis hispanica is a shrub belonging to the family Berberidaceae and the genus Berberis (pronounced bẽr’ber-is). It is a woody plant and parts of the plant are considered toxic, although the berries are edible and juicy.

Distribution
Berberis hispanica is native to temperate and Subtropical regions. It is distributed in the regions of South-West Mediterranean covering the North of Africa and the southern half of the Iberian Peninsula. It appears from 1000m or up to 2000m in altitude. It is found on hedges of mountains overlooking the Mediterranean.

Morphology
Berberis hispanicais a deciduous shrub growing up to 3 meters (10 feet)high. The stems and young branches are reddish or dark purple. The bark is covered with 3 to 5 branched spines, which are bracts or modified leaves. The central spine is usually larger. The leaves are oval, arranged in fascicles on short peduncles originated in the axils of the spines. The leaves are thick, leathery, similar to the size of the spines, and 1 to 5 cm long. Each leaf is attached to a short petiole.

Flowers and fruits
The flowers are yellow. They form raceme inflorescence and make clusters of 3 to 9 flowers attached in a long panicle. Each flower is about 6 mm in diameter. The sepals are oval and entire. The petals are similar to sepals. The interiors of the flowers are filled with nectar at base. The flowers usually contain six stamens. The fruits are oblong lilacs or blue berries. The fruits are 1 cm long and covered with wax. The berries contain two seeds. The flowers are mature from April to June.

Uses
The root and flowers have been used to extract yellow dyes. The fruits are sweet and sour tastes. The fruits have been used to produce syrups and soft drinks. The fruits are rich in Vitamin C. The bark contains an alkaloid, Berberine. It stimulates the uterus and the intestine. It may cause liver complaints, rheumatism and sciatica. Some species of the genus Berberis are used as ornamental plants. Barberry is often parasitized by the fungus Puccinia gram inis and becoming part of the life cycle of the fungus. For this reason, barberry was removed from many places.

References

hispanica
Flora of Morocco
Flora of Spain
Flora of Algeria
Flora of Tunisia
Flora of Portugal
Plants described in 1852